Bloody Dick may refer to:

Bloody Dick Creek, a stream in Montana, United States
Bloody Dick Peak, a summit in Montana, United States